Gurabo is a suburban section in northeast Santiago de los Caballeros, Dominican Republic. It contains a population estimated at 42,000. Gurabo is best known for its tobacco plantations and amber mines.

Development

The growth of Santiago de los Caballeros has also spurred the development of Gurabo, being that its close to the city. Gurabo was once very rural yet has always had agricultural, industrial, commercial and textile sectors. Today, it retains these sectors yet with its growth there are many housing developments, which began in the late 1990s. This has led to Gurabo being considered a satellite city of Santiago.

Notable people

Famous people born in Gurabo:

 Former Dominican President Hipólito Mejía and his wife, First Lady Rosa Gómez Arias.
 María Josefa de los Santos Domínguez Gómez, wife of President Juan Isidro Jimenes.
 Brothers Rubén and Muni Díaz Moreno, participants in the revolts for the return of Dominican constitutionality in 1965.
 Víctor Méndez, politician.

References

Populated places in Santiago Province (Dominican Republic)